Utlwanang is a township 4 km northwest of Christiana in Dr Ruth Segomotsi Mompati District Municipality in the North West province of South Africa.

References

Populated places in the Lekwa-Teemane Local Municipality
Townships in North West (South African province)